Armen Akopyan (born 15 January 1980 in Zaporizhzhia, Ukrainian SSR) is a Ukrainian football midfielder of Armenian descent. He last played for FC Poltava.

Akopyan spent most of his career playing for Ukrainian team FC Metalurh Zaporizhya.

External links
Statistics at FFU website

1980 births
Living people
Footballers from Zaporizhzhia
Ukrainian people of Armenian descent
Ethnic Armenian sportspeople
Ukrainian footballers
FC Metalurh Zaporizhzhia players
FC Metalurh Donetsk players
FC Kryvbas Kryvyi Rih players

Association football midfielders